Bellingrodt is the name of the following people:

 Carl Bellingrodt (1897–1971), German railway photographer
 Hanspeter Bellingrodt (born 1943), Colombian Olympic sports shooter
 Helmut Bellingrodt (born 1949), Colombian sport shooter, Olympic silver medallist
 Horst Bellingrodt (born 1958), Colombian Olympic sports shooter